Stuhlmann's starling (Poeoptera stuhlmanni) is a species of starling in the family Sturnidae. It is found in Burundi, the Democratic Republic of the Congo, Ethiopia, Kenya, Rwanda, South Sudan, Tanzania, and Uganda. Their length is usually around 19 cm, and they feed on seed, grain, arthropods and larvae.

References

Stuhlmann's starling
Birds of Central Africa
Birds of East Africa
Stuhlmann's starling
Taxonomy articles created by Polbot